Elijah J. Cresswell (18 July 1889 – 4 November 1931) was a Scottish amateur football forward who played in the Scottish League for Queen's Park.

Personal life 
Cresswell worked as a claims inspector and as of 1915 was married with two children. In 1915, during the second year of the First World War, he enlisted as a guardsman in the Coldstream Guards.

Career statistics

References

1889 births
Scottish footballers
Scottish Football League players
British Army personnel of World War I
Footballers from Glasgow
Association football outside forwards
Queen's Park F.C. players
1931 deaths
Coldstream Guards soldiers
Association football inside forwards
Parkhead